Raccordo autostradale 16 Cimpello-Pian di Pan (RA 16), previously known as nuova strada ANAS 14 Cimpello (A28-SS 13) (NSA 14), is an autostrade in italy that connects the Cimpello exit of Autostrada A28 with Strada statale 13 Pontebbana in Pian di Pan, for a development of 3.754 kilometers. In some maps, it is reported as via Pontebbana. It is managed by Friuli Venezia Giulia Strade.

References 

RA16
Transport in Friuli-Venezia Giulia